The men's 89 kg competition at the 2019 World Weightlifting Championships was held on 23 September 2019.

Schedule

Medalists

Records

Results

References

Results 

Men's 89 kg